Anna Lewandowska ( Stachurska; 7 September 1988) is a Polish karateka, personal trainer and entrepreneur. She is a multiple medalist in the World, European, and national Championships. She is the wife of footballer Robert Lewandowski.

Early life and education
Lewandowska was born on 7 September 1988 in Łódź to Bogdan Stachurski and his wife Maria. She is a graduate of the Academy of Physical Education in Warsaw, defending her thesis in 2012.

Career
Lewandowska is a member of Pruszkow Karate Club. During her career she won three medals in the world championships seniors, six European Championships medals in different age categories (including two European Championships seniors), and 29 Polish Championship medals.

At September 2013, Lewandowska became a nutritionist. She started the blog Healthy Plan by Ann, which provides nutritional advice and workout plans.

In 2014, she published her first book Żyj zdrowo i aktywnie z Anną Lewandowską (Lead a Healthy and Active Life with Anna Lewandowska) in which she encourages readers to change their eating habits and offers recipes for a number of dishes as well as exercises prepared by herself.

In 2016, she was appointed director of the Polish Special Olympiads, an organization which provides support for the mentally disabled through sport as well as raises social awareness about the challenges faced by this group of people. The same year, she launched the Foods by Ann brand which sells healthy snacks and dietary supplements.

In 2019, she became a host of the TV show Sztuki walki (Martial Arts) aired on the morning television programme Dzień Dobry TVN. The same year, she launched her cosmetics brand Phlov.

Personal life
On 22 June 2013, she married Robert Lewandowski, a Polish footballer, in Serock. In December 2016, Lewandowski announced that Anna was expecting their first child and was five months pregnant. She gave birth to their daughter Klara on 4 May 2017.

In November 2019, Lewandowski confirmed that Anna was pregnant for the second time. Their second daughter, Laura,  was born on 6 May 2020.

References

Sources

External links

 Health Plan by Ann official site

Polish female karateka
1988 births
Living people
Sportspeople from Łódź
Association footballers' wives and girlfriends